Philippe Maillet (born November 7, 1992) is a Canadian professional ice hockey forward who is currently playing under contract with Metallurg Magnitogorsk of the Kontinental Hockey League (KHL).

Early life
Maillet was born on November 7, 1992, in Lachenaie, Quebec (now Terrebonne, Quebec) to firefighter Mario Maillet and consultant Line Richard.

Playing career

Amateur
Maillet began his youth hockey career with the Collège Esther-Blondin Phénix of the Ligue de hockey Midget AAA du Québec (QMAAA), where he set the franchise record for most assists in a season with 34. His record, which was achieved during the 2008–09 season, stayed until Laurent Dauphin completed the 2011–12 season. Following his record-setting season, Malliet was drafted by the Victoriaville Tigres of the Quebec Major Junior Hockey League (QMJHL) but requested that they allow him to stay in midget AAA in order to develop. He returned to Phénix where he recorded 10 points in four games before earning a chance with the Victoriaville Tigres. After playing three games for the team and recording one goal, the Tigres agreed to keep him for the remainder of the 2009–10 season. During the season, he remarked that "I prefer to play with better players than me, it pushes me to go further and it allows me to evolve faster. Besides, my ability to follow the game has greatly improved since the start of the season."

Upon completing the previous season with 12 points in 58 games, Maillet returned to the team for his first full-length campaign. During the 2010–11 season, the Tigres traded their captain Philip-Michael Devos, forcing Maillet to step up in scoring. He finished the season with a new career high of 69 points in 67 games. The following season, Maillet continued to lead the team in scoring but felt he lacked consistency. He recorded 60 points in 52 games but admitted that "since the start of the campaign, I have produced in sequence... have to work on my consistency to help the team."

Going into the 2012–13 season, Malliet acknowledged this would be his last in major junior before joining U Sports. Malliet led the Tigres in scoring with 83 points in 65 games as they qualified for the 2013 QMJHL playoffs. He competed in eight playoff games, recording nine points, before suffering an ankle injury in the second round against the Baie-Comeau Drakkar and missing the remainder of the competition. In spite of his injury, he was invited to participate in the Vancouver Canucks 2013 training camp in September.

Collegiate
Maillet made his collegiate career debut with the University of New Brunswick Varsity Reds hockey team during the 2013–14 season as he earned his Bachelor of Arts degree in business administration. Within his first 12 games with the team, he recorded 15 points including five goals. He completed his rookie season leading the Reds in scoring and finish third around the AUS league with 41 points. The team qualified for the 2014 CIS University Cup where they lost in the AUS Semi-finals against the Saint Mary's Huskies. As a result of his regular season plau, he received the A.J. MacAdam Trophy as the Atlantic conference Rookie of the Year, becoming the first Reds player since 2008 to win the award, and was selected for the Second Team All-Stars and All-Rookie Team.

Following his successful rookie season, Malliet continued his offensive output and led the league with 39 points in 28 games. As the Reds qualified for the U Sports playoffs, he scored four goals to lift the team in Game 1 against the Acadia Axemen and added an assist on the Game 2 series winning goal to lift the team over the Axemen and win the AUS Championship. Following their AUS sweep, the Reds qualified for the 2015 CIS University Cup Final where they lost to the Alberta Golden Bears. As a result of his play, Malliet was awarded the Kelly Trophy as League MVP and was selected as a First Team All-Star.

In his junior season, Maillet recorded a career low 31 points in 17 games played due to an injury as the team qualified for the 2016 CIS University Cup. Without his assistance, the Reds won the 2016 CIS University Cup Championship for the sixth time in 10 years. Following his underwhelming year, Maillet and coach Gardiner MacDougall discussed his offseason training to get into "the best shape of my life."

In his final year, Maillet recorded a league leading 55 points, in what head coach MacDougall referred to as a "breakout season." as the Reds qualified for the playoffs for the second consecutive season. During the 2017 U Sports University Cup, he recorded a hat trick to help the team defeat the Queen's University Gaels 5–1 and received U Sports Player of the Year Award and the Senator Joseph A. Sullivan trophy. He attributed his success during the regular and post season to his work ethic during the off-season, saying "I was in really good shape at the start of the season and kept it up throughout the year." Two days later, he scored four assists in the final game to defeat the Saskatchewan Huskies 5–3 and win the U Sports University Cup. As a result of his play during the post-season, Maillet was named the 2017 playoffs MVP. He completed his collegiate career by signing an Amateur tryout (ATO) agreement with the Ontario Reign of the American Hockey League (AHL) on March 27, 2017. Although he had completed his collegiate career, Maillet received UNB's Male Athlete Of The Year Award and was named the Top Male University Athlete across Canada. Maillet concluded his collegiate career with a total of 166 points in 101 games for the UNB Reds.

Professional
Maillet made his AHL debut on March 31, 2017, where he scored his first professional goal in the 3–1 win over the Bakersfield Condors. He later recorded his first multi-point game in a 3–2 overtime win against the Stockton Heat on April 12. Maillet completed the 2016–17 season with the Reign and was invited to the Los Angeles Kings training camp prior to the 2017–18 season. He returned to the Reign for the season and increased his previous seasons scoring output to set a new career high in goals, assists, and points. As a result of his play, he swapped his ATO for an AHL contract with the Reign on July 19, 2018.

Maillet was invited to return to the Reign for the 2018–19 season in what would be his last season with the team. During this season, he recorded his first professional career hat trick in a 5–4 overtime win against the Tucson Roadrunners. His second career hat trick would come within the same month in a 7–6 game shootout win over the San Diego Gulls. He ended the season with a career high 54 points in 68 games which caught the eye of the Washington Capitals organization. He officially left the Reign on July 1, 2019, after signing a two-year, two-way $700,000 contract with the  Capitals.

Maillet began the 2019–20 season with the Capitals AHL affiliate, the Hershey Bears, where he recorded 44 points in 61 games. As a result of the COVID-19 pandemic in North America, the AHL suspended play and he was invited to the Washington Capitals return to play camp on July 13.

After two seasons with the Capitals organization, Maillet, as an impending free agent, left North America and signed a one-year contract with Russian club Metallurg Magnitogorsk of the KHL, on June 11, 2021.

Career statistics

Awards and honours

References

External links
 

1992 births
Living people
Hershey Bears players
Ice hockey people from Quebec
Metallurg Magnitogorsk players
Ontario Reign (AHL) players
People from Terrebonne, Quebec
Undrafted National Hockey League players
University of New Brunswick alumni
Victoriaville Tigres players
Washington Capitals players